Chiloglanis sardinhai is a species of upside-down catfish endemic to Angola where it is found only in Cuanza Sul Province.

This species grows to a length of  SL.

References

sardinhai
Catfish of Africa
Freshwater fish of Angola
Endemic fauna of Angola
Fish described in 1961